The Followers of Christ is a small Christian denomination based in the U.S. states of Oklahoma, Oregon, Idaho, and formerly California and Montana.

History 
The Followers of Christ church was founded in Chanute, Kansas, by Marion Reece (sometimes spelled Riess), rooted in Holiness and Pentecostal traditions. The church moved to Ringwood, Oklahoma, in the 1890s, where leadership passed to Elder John Marshall Morris, who was the father of Marion Morris. Marion Morris led the Ringwood, Oklahoma, branch of the church until his death in 1988.

During the 1920s, Charlie Smith (the founder's brother-in-law) and George White began missions in California. George White's nephew Walter White became a minister in the church. Walter moved to Oregon City, Oregon from Caldwell, Idaho in the 1940s, after a dispute with his cousin and co-minister, Vern Baldwin.  White and his congregation built a house of worship on Molalla Avenue in Oregon City, then a largely rural timber and farming community, now a suburb of Portland. He was a fiery speaker and maintained tight control over his congregation, often threatening members that they would go to hell if they dared to leave. White allowed outsiders, and former members said White was treated like a deity of sorts, as he claimed to have been called by God to preach.  White died in 1969, and the church has functioned without a minister since that time. The last elder associated with White: Glenford Lee, had died by the late 1980s, and the leaderless Oregon community became more isolated and inward-focused, and ceased recruitment of new members. Church services consist of singing ten hymns every Thursday and Sunday, without any spiritual teaching.

Estimates of the Oregon church's membership in 2008 ranged from 1,200 to 1,500. The Followers of Christ also have congregations in Ringwood, Oklahoma and Marsing, Idaho , and local communities operate independently of Followers of Christ churches in other areas.

The Oregon City congregation owns a church building, as well as a cemetery in Carus, where deceased church members are routinely buried.
There is also a church in Caldwell, Idaho.

See also
General Assembly and Church of the First Born

References

Further reading

Religion in Oregon
American faith healers
Pentecostal denominations
Oregon City, Oregon
Religion in the Pacific Northwest
Holiness denominations